Manege Banda Mahalakshmi (Kannada: ಮನೆಗೆ ಬಂದ ಮಹಾಲಕ್ಷ್ಮಿ) is a 1959 Indian Kannada film, directed by R. Govindaiah and produced by Raj Gopal. The film stars Kalyan Kumar, K. S. Ashwath, Revathi and Mynavathi in the lead roles. The film has musical score by Rajan–Nagendra.

Cast
Kalyan Kumar
K. S. Ashwath
Revathi
Mynavathi

References

1950s Kannada-language films
Films scored by Rajan–Nagendra